Burhoe is a surname. Notable people with the surname include:

J. Scott Burhoe (born 1954), United States Coast Guard personnel
Ralph Wendell Burhoe (1911–1997), American scientist
Ty Burhoe (born 1964), American tabla player, record company owner, and live concert producer

See also
Burhop